Irving Bibo (August 22, 1889 – May 2, 1962) was an American composer, songwriter, and publisher.

Biography
Bibo composed the songs "Those Panama Mamas", "Am I Wasting My Time on You", "My Cutey's Due at Two-to-Two To-Day" and "Sweet Little You".

He wrote tunes for the Ziegfeld Follies (including "Huggable, Kissable You", "Forever and a Day" and "Cherie"), Greenwich Village Follies, and other theatrical productions in the 1920s, scores for more than 300 motion pictures, and college songs.

References

External links

1889 births
1962 deaths
American male composers
American composers
American male songwriters
Musicians from San Francisco
20th-century American male musicians